The St. Marys Formation is a geologic formation in Maryland and Virginia, United States. It preserves fossils dating back to the Miocene Epoch of the Neogene period. It is the youngest Miocene formation present in the Calvert Cliffs and is part of the Chesapeake Group.

Vertebrate paleofauna
A diverse vertebrate paleofauna is known from the St. Marys Formation:

See also 

 List of fossiliferous stratigraphic units in Virginia
 Paleontology in Virginia

References

External links 
 

Geologic formations of the United States
Neogene geology of Virginia
Neogene Maryland
Paleontology in Maryland